Thelotrema lueckingii is a species of corticolous (bark-dwelling) crustose lichen in the family Graphidaceae. Found in the laurel forests of Madeira, it was formally described as a new species in 2013 by Othmar Breuss. The species epithet honours German lichenologist Robert Lücking.

The lichen has a thick, yellowish-white to greyish-green thallus with a roughened to uneven surface texture. The medulla is white to yellowish. The apothecia, which are immersed in thalline warts, are up to 2 mm in diameter with an ostiole up to 0.5 mm wide.

References

Graphidaceae
Lichen species
Lichens described in 2013
Lichens of Macaronesia